Michel Yachvili (born 25 September 1946) is a former French rugby union footballer.

His father was a Georgian POW during the World War II in France, and his son Grégoire chose to play for the Georgian national team. He began his career playing as Hooker for SC Tulle. He was a part of the French national team which won the 1968 Grand Slam in the Five Nations. In 1970 he moved to CA Brive where he played flanker.

Yachvili's son, Dimitri Yachvili, is also a France rugby union international.

External links
 ESPN profile

1946 births
French rugby union players
Living people
People from Tulle
Rugby union flankers
France international rugby union players
French people of Georgian descent
Sportspeople from Corrèze
CA Brive players